Taiki Matsuno (born October 16, 1967) is a Japanese actor and voice actor from Shinagawa, Tokyo. He is attached to Aoni Production. His real name, as well as his former stage name, is Tatsuya Matsuno. Matsuno is most known for the role of Hajime Kindaichi in Kindaichi Case Files, Kōga in Inuyasha, Japanese voice of SpongeBob in SpongeBob SquarePants (starting from 4th season until now), Tart in Fresh Pretty Cure!, Ling Tong and Liu Shan from Dynasty Warriors and Warriors Orochi series, Agumon in Digimon Savers and Shurikenger in Ninpuu Sentai Hurricaneger.

On July 14, 2021, it was announced Matsuno had tested positive for COVID-19.

Filmography

Film
The Hidden Blade (2004)
About Her Brother (2010)
Tokyo Family (2013)
Tora-san, Wish You Were Here (2019)
It's a Flickering Life (2021)

Television
Kusa Moeru (1979), Senman
Onna Taikōki (1981), Hashiba Hidetoshi (young Kobayakawa Hideaki)

Television animation
The Adventures of the Little Prince (1978) (The Prince)
Dragon League (1993) (Kazu)
Sailor Moon SuperS (1995) (Pegasus)
GeGeGe no Kitaro (1996 (90s), 2007 (00s)) (Sazae-oni (1990s, 2000s), Kurabokko (90s))
Magical Girl Pretty Sammy (1996) (Hiroto Majima)
Rurouni Kenshin (1996) (Nishiwaki & Beshimi)
Kindaichi Case Files (1997) (Hajime Kindaichi)
Bobobo-bo Bo-bobo (2003) (Tsuru Tsurina the IV)
Boogiepop Phantom (2000) (Echoes)
Inuyasha (2001) (Kōga)
One Piece (2003) (Lafitte, Hildon)
Yu-Gi-Oh! GX (2004) (Jun Manjōme)
Digimon Savers (2006) (Agumon)
One Piece (2007) (Canpacino),
One Piece (2008) (Hildon)
Fresh Pretty Cure! (2009) (Tart)
Digimon Xros Wars (2010) (Lucemon)
Kindaichi Case Files R (2014) (Hajime Kindaichi)
One Piece (2014) (Trebol)
Shichisei no Subaru (2018) (Cerinthus Ep 9-12)
Digimon Ghost Game (2021) (Mori Shellmon)

Original video animation (OVA)
Chameleon (1992) (Miki Hachiya)
Magical Girl Pretty Sammy (1997) (Hiroshi)
Mirage of Blaze (2004) (Yuzuru Narita)

Theatrical animation
Mobile Suit Gundam F91 (1991) (Arthur Jung)
Sakura Wars: The Movie (2001) (Kikunojo Oka)

Video games
Mermaid Prism
Inuyasha (Kōga)
Tales of Destiny (PS2 remake) (Igtenos Mindarde)
Dynasty Warriors 5 (Ling Tong)
Dynasty Warriors 7 (Ling Tong & Liu Shan)
Kessen (Hosokawa Tadaoki), (Hideyori Toyotomi), (Hideie Ukita), (Hiroie Kikkawa)
Tokimeki Memorial Girl's side 3rd Story Premium (Hasumi Tatsuya)

Drama CD
Baito wa Maid!? 2 - Shuubun!? Senden!? (Takeru Kirisawa)
Daisuki (Setsu Matsunari)
D.N.Angel, A Legend of Vampire (Krad)
Hameteyaru! (Shou Harada)
Mirage of Blaze series 4: Washi yo, Tarega Tameni Tobu (Yuzuru Narita)
Mizu no Kioku (Hikari Takatoo)

Tokusatsu
Kyuukyuu Sentai GoGo-V (SpellMaster Pierre)
Hyakujuu Sentai Gaoranger (Clock Org (ep. 18))
Ninpuu Sentai Hurricaneger (Sky Ninja Shurikenger (eps. 21 - 50))
Tokusou Sentai Dekaranger (Amoreian Baacho (ep. 45))
Mahou Sentai Magiranger (Hades Beastman Garim the Gremlin (ep. 20))
Kamen Rider Hibiki Hyper Video (Celadon Frog)
Juken Sentai Gekiranger (Flight Fist Confrontation Beast Crane-Fist Rūtsu (ep. 13 - 15))
Engine Sentai Go-onger (Savage Sky Barbaric Machine Beast Vacuum Banki (ep. 18))
Samurai Sentai Shinkenger (Ayakashi Sunasusuri (ep. 41))
Tensou Sentai Goseiger (Yuumajuu Jogon of the Ningyo (ep. 27))
Kamen Rider Fourze (Cygnus Zodiarts) (ep. 23 - 24))
Zyuden Sentai Kyoryuger (Debo Batissier (ep. 5))
Ressha Sentai ToQger (Chair Shadow (ep. 31 - 32))
Kamen Rider Ghost  (Kazai Ganma (Cubi) (eps. 19 - 28, 46, 49))
Kaitou Sentai Lupinranger VS Keisatsu Sentai Patranger (Yoshi Urazer (ep. 31))
Super Sentai Strongest Battle (Sky Ninja Shurikenger (Non Credit))

Dubbing

Live-action
3 Ninjas: High Noon at Mega Mountain (Samuel "Rocky" Douglas (Mathew Botuchis))
Friends (Sandy (Freddie Prinze Jr.))
Ted (SpongeBob SquarePants)
WarGames (David Lightman (Matthew Broderick))
West Side Story (1990 TBS edition) (Baby John (Eliot Feld))
Young Sherlock Holmes (John Watson (Alan Cox))

Animation
SpongeBob SquarePants (SpongeBob SquarePants) (Season 4-Current)
The SpongeBob SquarePants Movie (SpongeBob SquarePants)
The SpongeBob Movie: Sponge Out of Water (SpongeBob SquarePants)

References

External links
 Official agency profile 
 Taiki Matsuno at the Seiyuu database
 Taiki Matsuno at GamePlaza-Haruka Voice Acting Database 
 Taiki Matsuno at Hitoshi Doi's Seiyuu Database
 
 
 

1967 births
Living people
Aoni Production voice actors
Japanese male child actors
Japanese male film actors
Japanese male stage actors
Japanese male television actors
Japanese male video game actors
Japanese male voice actors
Male voice actors from Tokyo
People from Shinagawa
20th-century Japanese male actors
21st-century Japanese male actors